Terry Hollands (born 6 June 1979) is a British bodybuilder and the winner of the 2bros Pro Luke Sandoe Classic Beginners Class 2019 bodybuilding championships. Hollands was also a former strongman competitor and winner of Britain's Strongest Man and England's Strongest Man competitions. He's also a Europe's Strongest Man silver (2010) & bronze (2017) medalist, a 2 x time World's Strongest Man bronze medalist (2007 & 2011), a 2 x time Arnold Strongman Classic 8th-place winner (2011 & 2012), World's Ultimate Strongman 9th-place winner (2018), and the 5th most prolific strongman contestant in history having competed in more than 90 international competitions, winning 4 of them throughout 17 years. With 12 international event wins, Hollands is noted for his vehicle pulling skills, making him the 6th best vehicle puller in strongman history. He was nicknamed Terry 'The Tank' Hollands or 'Big Tel'.

Early life
Terry Hollands was born in 1979 in Dartford, Kent having a birth weight of 12 lbs 14oz. He was a keen sportsman in his childhood and teens, playing judo and rugby. However, despite sport being a big part of his life, he did not start serious gym training until he was 22 in order to help his rugby, and he typically focused on endurance training.

In 2004, he contracted a leg infection and on his return to the gym, he focused on strongman training. His training schedule has been described as "ferociously unforgiving" and he has espoused the benefits of visualisation techniques saying "you can't get by without it."

In 2017, Terry began his weight loss transformation going from 203 kg at his heaviest to 165 kg.
By January 2018, he was 147 kg and placed 3rd at Britain's Strongest Man – the lightest he had ever been throughout his entire strongman career. In February 2018, he measured at 12% bodyfat on a DEXA scan in the USA.
He then took this even further by taking part in a bodybuilding competition in 2019 where he stepped on stage at 135 kg and 5% bodyfat.

Career

Strongman career
Hollands' career as a strongman began in 2005, coming second at the 2005 England's Strongest Man and first at the 2005 UK's Strongest Man contests. Hollands also qualified for the 2005 World's Strongest Man competition, but he did not qualify for the finals.

In 2006, Hollands lost his UK's Strongest Man title to Glenn Ross but turned his attention to the Britain's Strongest Man competition. Hollands also took part in the 2006 World's Strongest Man competition and qualified for the finals. He placed seventh in the overall competition.

In 2007, Hollands regained his title of Britain's Strongest Man and returned to the 2007 World's Strongest Man later in the year. After winning his heat, finishing ahead of 1998 World's Strongest Man winner Magnus Samuelsson, Hollands produced arguably the best performance of his entire strongman career in the final. Hollands found himself in 6th place after the first three events. However, by finishing in the top three in each of the final four events, including winning the Truck Pull outright, he managed to overhaul a deficit to reigning champion Phil Pfister to finish third, becoming the first British competitor to achieve a podium finish since Gary Taylor in 1993. Indeed, it was only Sebastian Wenta narrowly beating Hollands in the Atlas Stones that prevented Hollands from finishing second overall.

The 2008 Britain's Strongest Man saw Hollands conceding his title to Jimmy Marku, coming second overall. However, in the 2008 World's Strongest Man contest, he qualified for the final, coming second in his qualifying heat, but in a hugely talented field, he placed last out of the ten finalists.

In 2009, Hollands had a much improved showing in the 2009 World's Strongest Man final, eventually finishing sixth overall.

In 2010, Hollands had series of podium finishes in the Strongman Champions League, including a win in Ireland (tied w/Žydrūnas Savickas). In June 2010, Hollands competed at the Europe's Strongest Man contest. However, he had to withdraw after tearing his bicep. In September 2010, Hollands recovered from his bicep injury and was able to compete at the 2010 World's Strongest Man contest where he made the final for the fifth consecutive year, and finished in 8th place. In December 2010, Hollands was crowned the 2010 SCL overall winner.

At the 2011 World's Strongest Man competition, Hollands performed at a consistently high level across all the disciplines to earn him his second podium finish at WSM, placing 3rd; he finished in the top 4 in all but one of the six disciplines in the final.

In 2012, a recurrence of his old biceps injury saw him withdraw from the final.

In the 2014 World's Strongest Man competition, Hollands became the first man to have qualified for the final for nine consecutive years. He placed fifth in the overall competition.

On 4 September 2015, he played rugby for England against the Rest of the World in a charity fundraising match.

In October 2018, Hollands appeared in a series of YouTube videos with four-time WSM Brian Shaw where he and Shaw purchased food from Costco, cooked it, and engaged in conversation in Shaw's gym.

In September 2019, Hollands competed at the Giants Live World Tour Finals shortly after competing in his first bodybuilding show. In November 2019, Hollands won the 2019 World's Strongest Man Masters competition held at the Official Strongman Games in Daytona, Florida.

After withdrawing from the 2021 World's Strongest Man, after sustaining an injury during the loading medley, Hollands announced his retirement from Strongman. During the competition, Hollands completed 2 events.

Bodybuilding career
In 2019, Hollands declined his invite to the World's Strongest Man 2019 contest and focused on bodybuilding. He competed in his first bodybuilding contest in August 2019 placing 1st in the Beginners category, 2nd in the Masters category, and 2nd in the Open Super Heavyweight category. This qualified him for the 2brospro British Finals, but did not participate due to other commitments.

He stepped on stage at 135 kg (297 lbs) at approximately 5–6% body fat – measured at 1 week out by a sports scientist using both callipers and bodpod technology at Canterbury Christ Church University.

Personal records
Done in official Strongman competition:
 Deadlift –  (2011 World's Strongest Man)
 Log Press –  (2010 SCL Finland)
 Axle Press –  (2010 Europe's Strongest Man)
 Dumbbell Press –  (2012 Arnold Strongman Classic)

Done in training:
 Deadlift –  (The plates were on top of two rubber pads hence the height from the floor is around 10")
 Log Lift –  
 Front Squat – 
 Bench Press –

References

External links
Interview in The Guardian

1979 births
Living people
English strength athletes
British strength athletes
People from Dartford